This is a list of Swedish monitors from the ironclads era.

Classes of Monitors
 
  (1865) - sold in 1919
  (1865) - sold in 1922
  (1866) - Sold for scrap in 1922
  (1869) - scrapped in 1908
  (1867) - sold for scrap in 1893
  (1868) - sunk as a target in 1907
  (1872) - retired in 1903
 
  (1872) - sold in 1919
  (1872) - retired in 1919
  (1873) - sold in 1919
  (1874) - sold in 1919
  (1874) - sold in 1919
  (1875) - sold in 1919
  (1875) - decommissioned in 1919

See also
 List of ironclads

External links